Age of Samurai: Battle for Japan is a Canadian-American documentary television series, distributed by Netflix and released on February 24, 2021. It takes place in feudal Japan from 1551 to 1616, during the final phase of the Sengoku period (The Age of Warring States), mainly the Azuchi–Momoyama period. It features reenactments of historical events and commentary by voice-over artist Hiro Kanagawa and historians Stephen Turnbull, David Spafford, Tomoko Kitagawa, Isaac Meyer and others. The story is about several powerful daimyo (warlords) who clash to unify Japan.

The series was produced by the Canadian firms Cream Productions and Blue Ant Media, for broadcast on Smithsonian Channel in Canada and Netflix internationally.

Synopsis 
Oda Nobunaga becomes head of the Oda clan upon the death of his father, but this causes problems with family members who compete for control. When Nobunaga conquers central Japan, he causes a war with the powerful daimyo Takeda Shingen. As Nobunaga's ambitions grow, one of his generals, Akechi Mitsuhide, becomes doubtful about his intentions and betrays him. Afterward, Toyotomi Hideyoshi becomes the de facto ruler of Japan. However, the young daimyo Date Masamune refuses to submit. After Hideyoshi unified Japan, he plots to expand his reign to China. Due to costly logistical issues and strong opposition, the campaign gets stuck in Korea. During the final months of Hideyoshi's life, he appoints five regents to govern until his young son Hideyori is old enough to assume power. However, the daimyo Tokugawa Ieyasu challenges the status quo and campaigns victoriously against his opponents, becoming the shogun of Japan that begins the Tokugawa shogunate that lasts for over 250 years.

Cast

Episodes

Awards
The series received three Canadian Screen Award nominations at the 9th Canadian Screen Awards in 2021, for Best Factual Program or Series, Best Production Design/Art Direction in a Non-Fiction Program or Series (Florian Schuck for the episode "The Rise of Nobunaga") and Best Direction in a Factual Program or Series (Stephen Scott for "The Rise of Nobunaga").

References

External links
 

2021 American television series debuts
2020s American documentary television series
2021 Canadian television series debuts
2020s Canadian documentary television series
English-language Netflix original programming
Television series about the history of Japan
Netflix original documentary television series
Television series set in feudal Japan
Television series set in the 16th century
Television series by Blue Ant Studios